Éric Micoud (born 18 March 1973 in Cotonou, Benin) is a French basketball player who played 20 games for the men's French national team between 1999 and 2001 .

References

French men's basketball players
French sportspeople of Beninese descent
1973 births
People from Cotonou
Living people
SIG Basket players
Cholet Basket players
Paris Racing Basket players
Black French sportspeople